The 2009 Illinois State Redbirds football team represented Illinois State University as a member of the Missouri Valley Football Conference (MVFC) during the 2009 NCAA Division I FCS football season. Led by first-year head coach Brock Spack , the Redbirds compiled an overall record of 6–5 with a mark of 5–3 in conference play, tying for third place in the MVFC. Illinois State played home games at Hancock Stadium in Normal, Illinois.

Schedule

References

Illinois State
Illinois State Redbirds football seasons
Illinois State Redbirds football